Grease Live! (Music from the Television Event) is the soundtrack to the 2016 live produced musical television special Grease Live!, a remake of the 1978 film Grease. The album was released on January 31, 2016 by Paramount Music in digital and physical formats, the same day as its television broadcast on Fox. The album featured songs from the film and eponymous stage musical, performed by the cast members featured in the television special. Four bonus tracks were included in the physical form of the soundtrack, released exclusively by Target Corporation through Republic Records on February 27, 2016.

The musical also featured five tracks written specifically for the show, with one being titled "All I Need Is an Angel" performed by Carly Rae Jepsen, was one of the two singles accompanying the soundtrack; the latter is a rendition of the titular track by Jessie J. The album debuted at number 37 on the US Billboard 200, earning 13,000 album-equivalent units in its first week, with just over 9,000 coming from pure sales. and further debuted at number 1 the same week on the Top Album Sales chart.

Background 
The live production featured three tracks that were specially made in the stage musical and not included in the film, which include "Freddy, My Love" and "Those Magic Changes", which are performed respectively by Keke Palmer and Jordan Fisher. Although not featuring in the musical as well as in the film, the song "Cake by the Ocean" performed by Joe Jonas' DNCE band was included in the musical as well as the accompanying album.

The song "All I Need Is an Angel" was specifically written for the production, by Tom Kitt and Brian Yorkey and performed by Carly Rae Jepsen. Jepsen who plays Frenchy, who did not have a musical number in the 1978 film. Hence, Marc Platt who executive produced the special, said "she has such a wish fulfillment — she’s the one who gets a teen angel in all the productions of Grease —that giving her a musical moment felt really organic to the story and really great for a character who otherwise doesn’t have a musical moment. And then when we ended up casting Carly Rae Jepsen in it, it felt like well there’s even more of a reason because who doesn’t want to hear her sing? So it’s all those elements combined together and thankfully we came up with a song we all loved that fits the narrative and furthers the narrative so it’s a happy win for everyone."

Although the musical featured over 23 songs performed by the cast, only 19 of them being included in the soundtracks. The songs "Alma Mater" (performed by Ana Gasteyer and Haneefah Wood) and "Mooning" (performed by DNCE) were not included in any version of the album. "It’s Raining on Prom Night", only featured as a background music in the special.

Track listing

Charts

Personnel 

 Randal Kleiser – conductor, keyboards
 Brian Kilgore – percussion
 Dave Kendrick – lead guitar
 John Wilson – rhythm guitar
 Taylor Hale – bass
 Chad Timon – drums
 Isaiah Miller – piano, keyboards
 Lindsey Stirling, David Garrett – violins
 Laura Freeman – viola
 Joshua Alexander Sykes – cello
 Nick Payton, Kail Graham – trumpets
 Lil' Joey – trombone
 Ray Hanson, Kirk Sanborn – saxophones, flutes
 Arnold McCuller, Dorian Holley, Fred White, Emily Stevens, Kathy Gray, Siedah Garrett – vocals
 Bob Garrett – vocal director
 Jared Stein – conductor
 Charlie Bisharat – concertmaster
 Kuk Harrell, Tom Kitt, Scott M. Riesett – producer
 Steve Genewick – engineer
 Alan Armitage, Mike Lawson, Matt Teacher – assistant engineer
 Frank Wolf – mixing
 Gavin Lurssen – mastering

References 

Republic Records soundtracks
Musical film soundtracks
Television soundtracks
Cast recordings
Grease (musical)
2016 soundtrack albums